Kerzaz is a town and commune, and capital of Kerzaz District, in Béchar Province, western Algeria. According to the 2008 census its population is 5,028, up from 4,276 in 1998,
 and its annual growth rate is 1.7%.

Geography

Kerzaz lies on the left (northeast) bank of the Oued Saoura in the Saoura valley. The Grand Erg Occidental, a large area of continuous sand dunes lies to the east, while the rocky ridges of the Ougarta Range rise to the west, running from northwest to southeast along the opposite side of the river from the town.

Climate

Kerzaz has a hot desert climate, with extremely hot summers and mild winters, and very little precipitation throughout the year.

Economy

Agriculture is the main industry in Kerzaz. There are a total of 63,570 date palms planted in the commune. As of 2009 there were 1,145 sheep, 575 goats, 228 camels, and 20 cattle.

Infrastructure and housing

95% of Kerzaz's population is connected to drinking water, 95% is connected to the sewerage system, and 87% (including 1,161 buildings) have access to electricity. There is one fuel service station in the town.

Kerzaz has a total of 840 houses, of which 680 are occupied, giving an occupation rate of 7.4 inhabitants per occupied building.

Transportation

Kerzaz is on the N6 national highway between Béchar to the northwest and Adrar to the southeast. Towns accessible to the north via the N6 include Béni Ikhlef, El Ouata, Béni Abbès and Igli, while to the south the towns of Timoudi, Ouled Khoudir and Ksabi can be accessed.

Education

There are 4 elementary schools, with 34 classrooms including 20 in use. There are a total of 1,076 school students.

4.9% of the population has a tertiary education, and another 18.7% has competed secondary education. The overall literacy rate is 78.5%, and is 90.7% among males and 66.9% among females.

Health

Kerzaz has 2 polyclinics, 2 room care facilities, and a maternity ward.

Religion

Kerzaz has 3 operational mosques, with another 1 under construction.

Localities
The commune is composed of three localities:

Kerzaz Megsem
Zaouia el Kbira
Kerzaz Ksar

Kerzaz Megsem is at the location where the N6 highway departs from the Oued Saoura and enters the Ougarta Range.

References

Neighbouring towns and cities

Communes of Béchar Province